Juan González (born 9 December 1967) is a Guatemalan judoka. He competed in the men's lightweight event at the 1996 Summer Olympics.

References

1967 births
Living people
Guatemalan male judoka
Olympic judoka of Guatemala
Judoka at the 1996 Summer Olympics
Place of birth missing (living people)